Note

References

Mayors of places in Indonesia
People from Parepare